The Beduhe Dam is a concrete-face rock-fill dam currently under construction near Kani Mase in Dohuk Province, Iraq. The foundation stone for the dam was laid on 18 February 2010.

References

External links
 YouTube Beduhe Dam Explosion

Dams in Iraq
Concrete-face rock-fill dams
Dams under construction